Mads Agesen (born 17 March 1983) is a Danish former professional footballer who played as a defender.

Club career

AGF
Agesen joined AGF from Thisted FC in January 2004. He had moved with his girlfriend to the city when he had to started his studies. He started on their reserve team in the Denmark Series. But in June 2004, AGF decided to offer him a contract. At the same time he held his two-year contract, Agesen had to work in a local supermarket.

Thisted FC
Thisted FC announced in July 2005 that they had signed Agesen back from AGF.

Aarhus Fremad
On 26 February 2007, Aarhus Fremad announced they had signed Agesen onto a professional contract.

FC Fredericia
Agesen signed onto FC Fredericia in June 2008 on a part-time deal. He became a very important player for the club and the captain. After two good seasons, he left the team.

AC Horsens
On 1 September 2010 it was confirmed, that Agesen had signed a three-year contract with AC Horsens. This transfer was a division step-up for Agesen.

Agesen suffered from jumpers knee in his first season at the club, and played in fewer games. He was out with jumpers knees for about 1 year, but returned to the pitch after a saline injection in February 2012. In August of the same year, he suffered from a pulled muscle injury. This time, he was only out for 6 weeks. In March 2013, he broke his jaw and was out for three weeks. Due to his many injuries, he did not play in many games with the club and left in the summer of 2013.

Randers FC
On 4 January 2013 it was confirmed that Agesen had signed a three-year contract with Randers FC beginning in the summer 2013. Randers tried to sign him already starting in January, but AC Horsens didn't allow him to transfer until the season was done.

He played his first league game for Randers on August 4th, 2013 against F.C. Copenhagen, where he replaced Nicolai Brock-Madsen in the 83rd minute in a 3-1 victory.

In May 2015, Agesen was operated on for a sports hernia. A month later, he extended his contract until 2018. He recovered from his injury and returned to play in August 2015.

References 

1983 births
Living people
Danish men's footballers
AC Horsens players
Randers FC players
Danish Superliga players
People from Thisted
Association football defenders
Sportspeople from the North Jutland Region